According to Sophocles' play Antigone, Haemon  or Haimon (Ancient Greek: Αἵμων, Haimon "bloody"; gen.: Αἵμωνος) was the mythological son of Creon and Eurydice, and thus brother of Menoeceus (Megareus), Lycomedes, Megara, Pyrrha and Henioche.

Polynices attacked Thebes with his supporters in the war of the Seven against Thebes.  Both brothers died in the battle.  King Creon, Oedipus' brother-in-law and the sons' uncle, decreed that Polynices was not to be buried or mourned in any way.

Sentence of Creon 
Creon decreed that Antigone was to be thrown into a cave with one day's worth of food, despite her engagement to his son, Haemon. The gods, through the blind prophet Tiresias, expressed their disapproval of Creon's decision, which convinced him to rescind his order, and he went to bury Polynices. However, Antigone had already hanged herself on the way to her burial. When Creon arrived at the tomb where she was to be left, his son Haemon threatens him and tries to kill him, but ends up taking his own life. Creon's wife Eurydice, informed of Haemon's death, took her own life in grief.

Suicide 

Haemon is betrothed to Antigone. He must choose between his father (whom he has always followed) and his lover Antigone. He chooses Antigone but cannot separate himself from either because of the strong ties of family and love. He commits suicide because of his helpless situation, which also leads his mother to commit suicide.  These actions cause Creon's madness at the play's conclusion.

Haemon's first entrance in Antigone is right after he has heard about Creon sentencing Antigone to death. He attempts to reason with Creon, citing the feelings of the people of Thebes, while subtly working in his own plea for Antigone's life. The conversation quickly escalates into a fight between the two, at the end of which Haemon declares he will take his own life.

See also
Epigoni
Suicides in Greek mythology
Princes in Greek mythology